The 1991 UNCAF Nations Cup was the inaugural UNCAF Nations Cup, the Central American championship for men's national association football teams. It was organized by the Unión Centroamericana de Fútbol or UNCAF, and it took place in Costa Rica from 26 May to 2 June 1991. All matches were played in the Costa Rican capital, San José at the Estadio Nacional. The top two teams, apart from Costa Rica, go on to participate in the 1991 CONCACAF Gold Cup. Costa Rica were given a bye due to their performance at the 1990 FIFA World Cup.

Three teams qualified to enter the tournament alongside hosts Costa Rica, chosen to hold the tournament by UNCAF that same year. The teams played in a round-robin format, with the winner being the squad who obtained the best overall results. The first UNCAF Nations Cup match took place between El Salvador and Guatemala. Since the match ended in a 0-0 draw, the following one between Costa Rica and Honduras produced the first goal in UNCAF Nations Cup history. It was scored by Róger Gómez of Costa Rica. The mascot of the competition was a boy named "Minchito '91".

Hosts and pre-tournament favourites Costa Rica earned 6 points from three wins after defeating Guatemala 1–0 in front of a crowd of 16,500 people, and became the first nation to win the UNCAF Nations Cup.

Host selection 

During the Confederation of North, Central American and Caribbean Association Football (CONCACAF) Congress in Guatemala City, Guatemala on 26 January 1991, the qualification rounds for the inaugural CONCACAF Gold Cup was decided upon. Since Costa Rica were given a bye into the competition due to its first place standing at the 1989 CONCACAF Championship, which also served as a qualification phase for the FIFA World Cup hosted by Italy in 1990, they weren't required to participate in the preliminary stages. However, the final qualification round of the Central American zone had two bids: the United States and Costa Rica. Costa Rica won the bid and was named by CONCACAF and UNCAF as the host nation of the inaugural UNCAF Nations Cup tournament on 19 February 1991.

Qualification 

The draw for the 1991 UNCAF Nations Cup qualifying competition for Central America took place in Guatemala City on 26 January 1991. Six teams entered to compete for the three remaining places in the competition, alongside eventual host Costa Rica. The teams were divided into three groups of two. As the host nation of the event, Costa Rica qualified automatically. The qualifying process began in April 1991 and concluded in May 1991. At the conclusion of the qualifying group stage, the three group winners qualified for the tournament.

Qualified teams 
The following four teams qualified for the finals:

Match Officials 
A list of 13 referees from eight football federations for the tournament were chosenn to participate in the tournament.
Referees

Antigua and Barbuda
 Arlington Success

Costa Rica
 Rodrigo Badilla
 Berny Ulloa
 Carlos Arrieta
 Ronald Gutiérrez
 Guillermo Hernández
 José Luis Vargas

El Salvador
 José Gómez

Guatemala
 Jorge Meléndez

Honduras
 José Luis Fuentes

Mexico
 Carlos Javier Castellanos

Panama
 Alberto Thomas

United States
 Vicente Mauro

Venues

Stadium 
The Estadio Nacional, Costa Rica's national stadium and home of the Costa Rica national football team, was announced as the sole venue of the tournament.

Accommodations 
Hotels and base camps were used by the four national squads to stay and trainbefore and during the UNCAF Nations Cup tournament. All teams opted to stayin hotels in San José.

Training Grounds 
Six venues were chosen as training grounds. Most teams opted to trainoutside San José. Only Costa Rica trained in the national capital on privatelyowned football pitches.

Mascot 

Minchito '91, the mascot for the 1991 competition, was the first UNCAF Nations Cup mascot, and one of the first mascots to be associated with a major sporting competition in Central America. Inspired in "the traditions, beliefs, legends and customs of Costa Rica", Minchito was born as an authentic peasant. The boy, who is seven-years-old, was created by the Hispanic Publicity Company. The name is a diminutive of the name 'Benjamín' in Costa Rica. Minchito is dressed with a white shirt, a red scarf and belt with black shorts, the most common set of clothes of a Costa Rican peasant.

Squads 

Each team's squad consisted of 18 players (two of whom must be goalkeepers). Teams also had two additional reserve players they could use as replacements in the event of serious injury, at any time. During a match, all remaining squad members not named in the starting team are available to be one of the three permitted substitutions (provided the player is not serving a suspension).

Tournament Overview

Format 
All times are Central Time Zone (UTC-6)
In the following tables:
Pld = total games played
W = total games won
D = total games drawn (tied)
L = total games lost
GF = total goals scored (goals for)
GA = total goals conceded (goals against)
GD = goal difference (GF−GA)
Pts = total points accumulated
The four teams played in round-robin format to determine the winner. This format would guarantee each team at least three games. Each team were awarded 2 points for a win and 1 point for a draw.

If two or more teams were equal on points on completion of the group matches, the following tie-breaking criteria were applied:

Results

Statistics

Goalscorers 
Claudio Jara received the Golden Boot for scoring five goals. In total, 14 goals were scored by 8 different players.

5 goals
  Claudio Jara
2 goals
  Róger Gómez
  Norman Gómez

1 goal

  Raúl Díaz Arce
  Guillermo Rivera
  Juan Carlos Espinoza
  Gilberto Machado
  Leonidas Flores

All-Star Team 
Chilean sports magazine Triunfo evaluated player performances through statistical data finished with the following players leading each position.

References

External links 
  

1991 in Central American football
1991
1991
1991 in Costa Rican sport